The Giro dell'Emilia is a late season road bicycle race held annually in Bologna, Emilia-Romagna, Italy. Since 2005, the race has been organised as a 1.HC event on the UCI Europe Tour, and since 2020 it's part of the UCI ProSeries calendar. The race starts from Bologna, it generally takes a tour of Appennino Tosco-Emiliano National Park and ends in Bologna with 5 reps on the brutal climbing ring (Orfanelle climb, Montalbano climb and Casaglia downhill) of Sanctuary of the Madonna di San Luca. It is considered one of the most important and historical classic bicycle races of the calendar, the palmarès shows great champions like Coppi, Bartali, Merckx.

Winners

Wins per country

References

External links
 

 
UCI Europe Tour races
Cycle races in Italy
Recurring sporting events established in 1909
1909 establishments in Italy
Classic cycle races